George Jardine (8 November 1926 - 29 May 2015 ) was an Australian rugby league footballer who played in the 1940s and 1950s.  Jardine played in the New South Wales premiership competition and won a premiership with St. George in 1949.

Career
A Wollongong, New South Wales junior, Jardine played five seasons for St. George between 1947-1950 and 1952. He became a premiership winner when he  played at lock-forward in 1949 Grand Final win over South Sydney. After playing 70 grade games for St George, George Jardine returned to the Illawarra league in 1953 joining the Northern Suburbs Wollongong club. He also had a long association with the Helensburgh Tigers rugby league football club.

References

1926 births
2015 deaths
Australian rugby league players
Rugby league players from New South Wales
Rugby league props
St. George Dragons players